Fruitland is an unincorporated community and census-designated place (CDP) in Henderson County, North Carolina, United States. Its population was 2,031 as of the 2010 census.

History
A post office called Fruitland was established in 1883, and remained in operation until 1906. The community was named for apple orchards near the original town site.

Geography
U.S. Route 64 runs along the southern edge of the CDP, leading west to Hendersonville and northeast  to Bat Cave.

Demographics

References

Census-designated places in North Carolina
Census-designated places in Henderson County, North Carolina
Unincorporated communities in North Carolina
Unincorporated communities in Henderson County, North Carolina